Virginia M. "Ginny" Coppola is an American political aide and politician who represented the 1st Bristol District in the Massachusetts House of Representatives from 2006–2007. She succeeded her late husband Michael J. Coppola, who died eight months into his third term.

References

Republican Party members of the Massachusetts House of Representatives
People from Bristol County, Massachusetts
Living people
Women state legislators in Massachusetts
1949 births
People from Foxborough, Massachusetts
21st-century American women